The Vancouver Island Ranges, formerly called the Vancouver Island Mountains, are a series  of mountain ranges extending along the length of Vancouver Island which has an area of .  The Vancouver Island Ranges comprise the central and largest part of the island.  The Geological Survey of Canada refers to Vancouver Island, Haida Gwaii, and the Alaska Panhandle as the Insular Belt including the sea floor out to 100 km (62 mi) west of Vancouver Island. The Vancouver Island Ranges are a sub-range of the Insular Mountains.

Explorations
The first European sighting of these ranges was likely Sir Francis Drake.  A sighting of land  on June 5, 1579 was recorded by his crew aboard the vessel Golden Hind at a latitude of 48 degrees north but not finding safe harbour, they moved on southward.  The highest peak of the Vancouver Island Ranges, the Golden Hinde, is named for his vessel.

The first European explorer likely to have observed any of the mountains of the Vancouver Island Ranges would have been Captain Juan José Pérez aboard the Spanish frigate Santiago.  Although he anchored off Estevan Point, on August 8, 1774 he did not land.  Captain James Cook entered Nootka Sound March 29, 1778 and spent about a month refitting his ships Discovery and Resolution.  His logs contain the first recorded reference to the mountains of Vancouver Island.  In 1788 British Captain John Meares began a small settlement at Nootka Sound and the following year, the Spanish built a permanent fort at Friendly Cove (Yuquot) in Nuu-chah-nulth territory.  The Spanish claimed sovereignty and a dispute arose which was resolved with the Nootka Convention of the 1794.  There was little further exploration until the Hudson's Bay Company was granted rights to Vancouver Island on January 13, 1849 leading to the first attempt, by Captain Hamilton Moffat in 1852 to ascend a major peak on the Island when he attempted Rugged Mountain.

Adam Grant Horne located a trail across the island from the Qualicum River to the Alberni Inlet in 1856 and Joseph Despard Pemberton, Surveyor General of the Colony of Vancouver Island explored much of the southern half of the Island in 1857.  The southern Island was further explored by the Vancouver Island Exploring Expedition in 1865.  By the mid-1880s the southern half of the island had been explored and by 1890 the northern region had been explored as well.  The central part of the island, the area now within Strathcona Provincial Park, was explored by Reverend William Washington Bolton, Headmaster of the Victoria School for Boys, in 1894 and 1896.

Ranges

Only a few of the many subranges of the Vancouver Island Ranges have official names.  These are:

 Refugium Range:  On the Brooks Peninsula.
 Sophia Range: On Nootka Island, on the peninsula between Esperanza Inlet and Nuchatlitz Inlet.
 Genevieve Range: Nootka Island.
 Karmutzen Range: Between Nimpkish Lake, Tlakwa Creek and Karmuzten Creek.
 Hankin Range: Between Nimpkish Lake and Bonanza Lake.
 Franklin Range:  Near Robson Bight on the Johnstone Strait between the Tsitika River and Kokish River.
 Bonanza Range:  Between the Nimpkish River and the Tsitika River by Bonanza Lake.
 Sutton Range: Between Nimpkish River, White River, ktwanch River, Gold River.
 Newcastle Ridge: Johnstone Strait, west of Sayward-Kelsey Bay and east/north of Adams River
 Prince of Wales Range: East coast of Vancouver Island 40 km (25 mi) north of Campbell River.
 Halifax Range: Along Johnstone Strait between Amor de Cosmos Creek and Pye Creek.
 Beaufort Range: North of Port Alberni and west of Qualicum Beach.
 Pelham Range:  Between the Sarita River and Alberni Inlet.
 Somerset Range: Between The Pacheena-Sarita River basins and the Klanawa River (between Nitinat Lake and Imperial Eagle channel)
 Seymour Range: Between the valley of Cowichan Lake, San Juan River and Gordon River.
 Gowlland Range:  Near Victoria between Saanich Inlet and Brentwood Bay. Includes Mount Work Regional Park.
 Pierce Range:  South of Gold River between the Jacklah River and the Burman River.
 Haihte Range: Between Tashsis River, the Nomash River, Zeballos Lake and Woss Lake.

The Elk River Mountains, located in Strathcona Provincial Park, are considered a range by some sources.

Peaks of the Vancouver Island Ranges

See also
Queen Charlotte Mountains

Sources

References

External links

Canadian Mountain Encyclopedia, Vancouver Island Ranges

 
Insular Mountains